James Kerr Proudfit (July 24, 1831 – May 30, 1917) was an American military officer during the American Civil War.

Biography
Proudfit was born on July 24, 1831 in Argyle, New York. Following his father's death, he moved with his family to Brookfield, Wisconsin Territory. On September 20, 1855, he married his wife, Emelie, in Delafield, Wisconsin. They would have six children. Proudfit died on May 30, 1917.

Career
Prudfit volunteered for the Union Army during the civil war and initially served in the 1st Wisconsin Volunteer Infantry Regiment. He later joined the 12th Wisconsin Volunteer Infantry Regiment. This regiment would take part in the Siege of Vicksburg and the Jackson Expedition. Proudfit became its commander in 1864, succeeding George E. Bryant. In 1865, he was brevetted a brigadier general. Proudfit was Adjutant General of Wisconsin from 1865 to 1868 and U.S. Surveyor General of the New Mexico Territory from 1872 to 1876. Proudfit served in the Wisconsin Senate in 1866 and 1867.

References

External links

People from Argyle, New York
People from Brookfield, Wisconsin
Adjutants General of Wisconsin
Military personnel from Wisconsin
People of Wisconsin in the American Civil War
Union Army colonels
American surveyors
Wisconsin state senators
1831 births
1917 deaths
People from Delafield, Wisconsin